In Greek mythology, Phoebe (associated with  phoîbos, "shining") was the name or epithet of the following characters:
 Phoebe (Titaness), one of the Titans, grandmother of Apollo and Artemis.
 Phoebe (daughter of Leucippus), daughter of Leucippus.
 Phoebe, a hamadryad who became one of King Danaus' many wives or concubines and possible mother of some of these Danaïdes: Hippodamia, Rhodia, Cleopatra, Asteria, Glauce, Hippomedusa, Gorge, Iphimedusa and Rhode. Apollodorus only identified these daughters of Danaus by Phoebe and Atlantia  (another hamadryad), not specifying who was the daughter of the other. These ten women joined the sons of Aegyptus who were begotten on an Arabian woman. Later on, these princesses slew their cousin-husbands during their wedding night. According to Hippostratus, Danaus had all of his progeny by a single woman, Europe, daughter of the river-god Nilus. In some accounts, he married his cousin Melia, daughter of Agenor, king of Tyre.
 Phoebe, one of the Heliades.
 Phoebe, a Spartan princess who was the daughter of King Tyndareus and Leda, daughter of King Thestius of Pleuron. She was the (half-)sister of Castor and Pollux, Helen, Clytemnestra, Timandra and Philonoe.
 Phoebe, one of the Amazons who fought against Heracles.
 Phoebe, an epithet of Artemis, also shared by Selene.

Also, Phoebe (crater) on Saturn's small moon Janus is named after Phoebe of Messenia.

Notes

References 

 Apollodorus, The Library with an English Translation by Sir James George Frazer, F.B.A., F.R.S. in 2 Volumes, Cambridge, MA, Harvard University Press; London, William Heinemann Ltd. 1921. ISBN 0-674-99135-4. Online version at the Perseus Digital Library. Greek text available from the same website.
 Diodorus Siculus, The Library of History translated by Charles Henry Oldfather. Twelve volumes. Loeb Classical Library. Cambridge, Massachusetts: Harvard University Press; London: William Heinemann, Ltd. 1989. Vol. 3. Books 4.59–8. Online version at Bill Thayer's Web Site
 Diodorus Siculus, Bibliotheca Historica. Vol 1-2. Immanel Bekker. Ludwig Dindorf. Friedrich Vogel. in aedibus B. G. Teubneri. Leipzig. 1888-1890. Greek text available at the Perseus Digital Library.
 Euripides, The Plays of Euripides, translated by E. P. Coleridge. Volume II. London. George Bell and Sons. 1891. Online version at the Perseus Digital Library.
 Euripides, Euripidis Fabulae. vol. 3. Gilbert Murray. Oxford. Clarendon Press, Oxford. 1913. Greek text available at the Perseus Digital Library.
 Gaius Julius Hyginus, Fabulae from The Myths of Hyginus translated and edited by Mary Grant. University of Kansas Publications in Humanistic Studies. Online version at the Topos Text Project.
 Hesiod, Theogony from The Homeric Hymns and Homerica with an English Translation by Hugh G. Evelyn-White, Cambridge, MA.,Harvard University Press; London, William Heinemann Ltd. 1914. Online version at the Perseus Digital Library. Greek text available from the same website.
 Publius Ovidius Naso, Metamorphoses translated by Brookes More (1859-1942). Boston, Cornhill Publishing Co. 1922. Online version at the Perseus Digital Library.
 Publius Ovidius Naso, Metamorphoses. Hugo Magnus. Gotha (Germany). Friedr. Andr. Perthes. 1892. Latin text available at the Perseus Digital Library.
 Publius Ovidius Naso, The Epistles of Ovid. London. J. Nunn, Great-Queen-Street; R. Priestly, 143, High-Holborn; R. Lea, Greek-Street, Soho; and J. Rodwell, New-Bond-Street. 1813. Online version at the Perseus Digital Library.
 Tzetzes, John, Book of Histories, Book VII-VIII translated by Vasiliki Dogani from the original Greek of T. Kiessling's edition of 1826. Online version at theio.com

Hamadryad
Nymphs
Amazons (Greek mythology)
Libyan characters in Greek mythology
Laconian characters in Greek mythology
Epithets of Artemis
Selene
Children of Helios
Metamorphoses into trees in Greek mythology